The General Elections Institution (abbreviated as LPU) was the body that organises elections in Indonesia during the New Order. Its responsibilities include deciding which parties can contest elections, organising the voting and announcing the results and seats won in the various branches of the government. The institution is under the Ministry of Home Affairs.

History
After the rise of Suharto as the president of Indonesia in 1967, Suharto began to prepare for elections in order to legitimize his seat. The first general elections in the New Order was prepared to be held in 1971 with Law Number 15 of 1969. The law stipulates that the president would form the General Elections Institution for the upcoming election. Suharto would later form the General Elections Institution by the Presidential Decree Number 3 of 1970.

According to the law, the General Elections Institution was a permanent institution with three elements, the executive council, the advisory council, and the secretariat. The president appoint the members of the institution with the Presidential Decree Number 7/M of 1970. The first chairman of LPU was Amir Machmud, who was the Minister of Home Affairs at that time. The Minister of Home Affairs would later hold the position for the chairman of LPU until 1998, when the organization was dissolved and replaced with General Elections Commission.

Seat of the General Elections Institution 
The Indonesian General Institution is located in a building on Jalan Imam Bonjol 29. The building, designed by architect A.W. Gmelig Meyling, was completed in 1955 and was among the first to be built in the post-war architecture style in Indonesia. It was described as "impressive" at its completion. The building was originally used for the office of the National Horticulture Centre of the Ministry of Agriculture.

Organization

Executive Council 
According to the Government Regulations Number 35 of 1985, the seats of the executive council was filled with ministerial posts. The chairman of the council was seated by the Minister of Home Affairs, while the vice chairman post was seated by the Minister of Information and the Minister of Justice.

List of chairmen
Even though the Minister of Home Affairs concurrently chaired the position of the Chairman of the General Elections Institution, there were no elections held during the ad interim term of Sudharmono, from 1982 until 1983.

References

Bibliography
 
 

 
 

Elections in Indonesia
Politics of Indonesia
Political organizations based in Indonesia
Indonesia